Dicepolia aerealis is a moth in the family Crambidae. It was described by James E. Hayden in 2009. It is found in Costa Rica (Guanacaste) and Venezuela (Barinas).

The length of the forewings is 6.6–8.4 mm. The forewings are brownish orange or reddish golden, with darker scales. There is a dark brown line on the costa and the transverse lines are also dark brown. The hindwings are off white basally. The termen is brassy with dark brown scales, fading into a pearly basal area. Adults have been recorded on wing from December to March in Costa Rica and in February in Venezuela.

Etymology
The species name is derived from Latin aereus (meaning "of bronze").

References

Moths described in 2009
Odontiinae